In organic chemistry, the principle of least motion is the hypothesis that when multiple species with different nuclear structures could theoretically form as products of a given chemical reaction, the more likely to form tends to be the one requiring the least amount of change in nuclear structure or the smallest change in nuclear positions.

References

Organic chemistry